Dr. Henry M. Joko-Smart (born 15 June 1934 Bonthe, British Sierra Leone) is a former Sierra Leonean law professor, educator and Supreme Court justice.

Early life 
Joko-Smart attended St. Edward's Secondary School in Freetown and Fourah Bay College. He obtained a B.A. in classics and a diploma in education from the University of Durham, UK, LL.B. (first class honours) and LL.M. from the University of Sheffield, UK, and a Ph.D. in law from the Law School at the School of Oriental and African Studies, University of London. He was called to the bar at Gray's Inn in London in 1965.

Career 
He had a lucrative practice in Freetown in the 1960s. From 1966 to 2000, he was a lecturer, senior lecturer, professor of law, and dean of the faculty of law of Fourah Bay College, a constituent college of the University of Sierra Leone. From 1998 to 2005, he served as a justice of the Supreme Court of Sierra Leone.

Joko-Smart was the chairman of the Sierra Leone Anti-corruption Commission between 2006 and 2007, replacing Val Collier.

He has also served the United Nations in several capacities, including as chairman of the 21st and 35th sessions of the United Nations Commission on International Trade Law (in 1988 and 2002, respectively), and a member of the panel of arbitrators of the International Centre for the Settlement of Investment Disputes in Geneva, Switzerland.

Personal life 
Joko-Smart is married to Daisy Smart, née Tucker. They have four children.

References

1934 births
Living people
Academic staff of Fourah Bay College
20th-century Sierra Leonean judges
Sierra Leonean politicians
Alumni of St. Edward's Secondary School, Freetown
Alumni of SOAS University of London
People from Bonthe District
Fourah Bay College alumni
21st-century Sierra Leonean judges